Antonín Puč (16 May 1907 – 18 April 1988) was a Czech footballer who played as a forward; he is the all-time leading scorer for the Czechoslovak national team.

Puč's international career lasted from 1926 to 1939; in that time, he played 61 matches for Czechoslovakia, scoring 35 goals. He played for Czechoslovakia in the 1934 FIFA World Cup scoring two goals, including one in the final, a 2–1 loss against Italy, and also played in the 1938 edition. Puč spent most of his club career with Slavia Prague.

After the split of the country into the Czech Republic and Slovakia and the corresponding national teams, Jan Koller surpassed Puč's record in 2005. Puč died in 1988 aged 80.

References

External links
 

1907 births
1988 deaths
Czech footballers
Czechoslovak footballers
SK Slavia Prague players
FK Viktoria Žižkov players
1934 FIFA World Cup players
1938 FIFA World Cup players
Czechoslovakia international footballers
Association football forwards
People from the Kingdom of Bohemia